Florian Ayé (born 9 January 1997) is a French professional footballer who plays as a forward for Brescia. He is of Beninese descent.

Career
On 5 July 2019, Ayé was sold by Clermont Foot to Serie A club Brescia Calcio. He signed a three-year contract with the club.

Career statistics

Honours

International
UEFA European Under-19 Championship: 2016

References

External links

 
 

1997 births
Living people
Footballers from Paris
Association football forwards
French footballers
France youth international footballers
AJ Auxerre players
Clermont Foot players
Brescia Calcio players
Ligue 2 players
Championnat National 2 players
Championnat National 3 players
Serie A players
French expatriate footballers
Expatriate footballers in Italy
French sportspeople of Beninese descent
Black French sportspeople